Panter is a surname. Notable people with the surname include:

Anne Panter (born 1984), English field hockey international in the 2012 Summer Olympics
David Panter (died 1558), Scottish diplomat, clerk and bishop of Ross
Derek Panter, English footballer
Frederick Panter (1836–1864), police officer, pastoralist and explorer in colonial Western Australia
Gary Panter (born 1950), cartoonist, illustrator, painter, designer and part-time musician
Horace Panter (born 1953), aka Sir Horace Gentleman, bassist for the British 2 Tone ska band The Specials
Howard Panter (born 1949), British theatre impresario and theatre operator
Kate Panter (born 1962), British rower
Michael J. Panter (born 1969), American politician and entrepreneur from the state of New Jersey
Mollie Panter-Downes (1906–1997), British novelist and columnist for The New Yorker
Peter Panter, pen name of Kurt Tucholsky (1890–1935), German-Jewish journalist, satirist, and author
Ricky Panter (born 1948), British Anglican priest

See also
Panter howitzer, artillery weapon developed by MKEK for the Turkish Land Forces Command
Panter Ridge, solitary ridge 0.5 nautical miles (0.9 km) long in the south part of Kyle Hills, Ross Island
Tallinn HC Panter, ice hockey team based in Tallinn, Estonia
Pant (disambiguation)
Pantera
Panther (disambiguation)
Planter (disambiguation)